Kristel Aina Oquindo Fulgar (born December 29, 1994) is a Filipino actress and singer. She is known for her roles in Goin' Bulilit, Maria Flordeluna, Dahil Sa Pag-ibig, Got to Believe and Bagito.

Filmography

Television

Films

Music

Personal life
Fulgar studied mass communication  at University of Santo Tomas, and graduated in 2015. In late 2022, she signed with South Korean agency Five Stones Entertainment.

References

External links

1994 births
Star Magic
Filipino film actresses
Filipino television actresses
Filipino television personalities
Living people
Members of Iglesia ni Cristo
21st-century Filipino actresses
ABS-CBN personalities